"Cavalier Eternal" is a song by the Gainesville, Florida-based punk rock band Against Me!, released as the first single from their 2003 album Against Me! as the Eternal Cowboy. While the album was released by Fat Wreck Chords, the 7-inch singles for "Cavalier Eternal" and "Sink, Florida, Sink" were released by the band's previous label No Idea Records, using alternate versions of the songs that differ from the versions on the album.

Background
For the recording of their second album, Against Me! as the Eternal Cowboy, Against Me! chose work with producer Rob McGregor, who had recorded their first album and two previous EPs. The band planned to record at Ardent Studios in Memphis, Tennessee, where they could make an all-analog recording with very few overdubs. In order to ensure that McGregor would be familiar with the new songs by the time they went to Memphis, the band recorded demos for the entire album at his Goldentone Studios in their hometown of Gainesville, Florida on July 15 in the span of a few hours. The rest of the album was recorded that August at Ardent. The version of "Cavalier Eternal" from the July 15 Goldentone session was used on the album, as Fat Wreck Chords head Fat Mike preferred it to the version recorded at Ardent. The band elected to release the Ardent version as a single through their previous label No Idea Records, along with a single for "Sink, Florida, Sink", both singles using alternate versions of songs from the album's recording sessions. The B-side of "Cavalier Eternal" is an acoustic recording of "You Look Like I Need a Drink", while the album version was recorded with a full band and electric instrumentation.

Track listing

Personnel

Band
 Laura Jane Grace – guitar, lead vocals, art concepts and layout
 James Bowman – guitar, backing vocals
 Andrew Seward – bass guitar, backing vocals

Production
 Rob McGregor – producer
 Pete Matthews – mixing engineer, engineer
 Adam Hill – assistant engineer
 Brad Blackwoon – mastering
 Bryan K. Wynacht – photography

See also
Against Me! discography

References

External links
 "Cavalier Eternal" at Against Me!'s official website – includes links to song lyrics
 "Cavalier Eternal" at No Idea Records

2004 singles
Against Me! songs
Songs written by Laura Jane Grace
2003 songs
Songs against capitalism